Eugenie McEvoy was an American artist known for her landscapes, flowers, portraits, and, particularly, the painting, Taxi! Taxi! (1928) which depicts a busy city street as seen from the back seat of a taxicab. She also performed in a sharpshooting act on the vaudeville stage, ran a kennel for breeding show dogs, served as manager and technical director of theatrical production companies, operated a large resort property in the Catskill region of New York, and worked with her husband in a piano restoration business.

Early life and training

Eugenie McEvoy learned to paint sometime before 1906 while she was living in France. Because there is no record that she received any formal instruction, it is possible that she learned from her first husband, the American painter, George A. Aldrich, who was an illustrator and decorative artist specializing in romantic rural landscapes.

Mature style

In 1918 McEvoy became a student at the School of the Art Institute of Chicago. Two years later McEvoy and Aldrich spent time at a village on the Breton coast called Quimperlé where Aldrich made sketches for a series of paintings. The location presented views of a type he favored: quaint structures clustered around a broad expanse of water crossed by an ancient bridge, in this case the Ellé river crossed by the 16th-century pont fleuri. McEvoy also made pictures of this scene and, in 1922, showed a painting called Quimperlé in an exhibition at the Art Institute of Chicago containing work by alumni of its school. In 1928 she placed a painting of hers in the Twelfth Annual Exhibition of the Society of Independent Artists held at the Waldorf-Astoria. Originally entitled Lenox 2300, the painting became well known under a later title, Taxi! Taxi!. (The name, "Lenox 2300", was displayed on the door panels of New York's yellow taxicabs during the 1920s.) Reviewing the Independents' show, Helen Appleton Read, the art critic for the Brooklyn Daily Eagle, called McEvoy's painting "an amusing canvas of what can best be designated as a petting party in a yellow taxi." 

When in 1931 McEvoy contributed a painting called Cuban Village to Society of Independent Artists exhibition at Grand Central Galleries, New York, a critic described it as "red roofs surrounded by tropical greenage, extremely well painted." The following year she put works in an exhibit sponsored by Salons of America and when she exhibited at the Salons the following year she showed her 1928 painting, Lenox 2300, now renamed Taxi! Taxi!. This time the painting drew the attention of critics for both the New York Sun and New York Times. The Sun's Henry McBride said it gave a "cinematic version of congested street traffic", rising above the quality of other works in the show, though "laboriously expressed." Edward Alden Jewell, in the Times, praised the painting for "the amazing skill with which technical difficulties have been tossed off by this artist" adding "not often does one encounter such sang froid at that. The painting's point of view is that of an unenthusiastic woman passenger who is permitting a male companion to nuzzle her neck. The two can be seen reflected in the glass screen that divides the front of the cab from the back. The driver's head is seen from behind and his image shows on his cab license on the back of the front seat. The viewer sees the hats of the cab's passengers and their intertwined feet. Through the cab's front and side windows can be seen a street crowded with pedestrians and traffic, including two autos comically teetering. The fare shown on the meter is high, suggesting a lengthy and unhurried trip. McEvoy exhibited this painting at an exhibition held by the Woodstock Art Association later in 1933, in 1949 at a solo exhibition at Town House in Woodstock, and again in 1956 at the Woodstock Museum of Art (where it drew comment as "Eugenie McEvoy's renowned canvas.")

Following the Salons of America exhibition of 1933 McEvoy showed her work mainly in Woodstock and vicinity. She appeared twice or three times a year in Woodstock galleries and less frequently in places like Poughkeepsie and Albany, New York. In a Woodstock Gallery exhibition of September 1935 she showed the painting, Quimperlé, which she had first shown in 1922. It was described as "a picturesque hillside town with a brilliant spot of sunlight on the topmost turrets, high above the gloomier buildings at the foot of the hill." In 1943 she placed a painting in a group show held in a New York Department store, Macy's Gallery of Tomorrow's Masterpieces. In 1948 and 1949 her work appeared in solo exhibitions in Woodstock. Of the first, a local reporter noted a gay atmosphere in the show and praised the lively appearance of McEvoy's subjects and her subtle use of color. The second included landscapes, flowers, houses, and portraits, as well as her well-known Taxi! Taxi!. A news account of the show said, "There is a feeling of strength about this artist's work. Also noticeable is an exceptional quality gained through the use of white."

Apart from Taxi! Taxi! McEvoy's work received scant review from New York art critics. Reporting on an interview conducted late in her career one reporter said her paintings showed "solid brushwork and rich colors" and praised her ability to transform "commonplace subject matter into a bold and exciting statement."

Personal information

Little is known of McEvoy's life as a child. The date and place of her birth are uncertain. She once reported that, as a child, she had received marksmanship training from her father, a captain in the French army, but on another occasion said that she had been orphaned as a baby and raised in France by her mother's family. The conflict between these accounts can be reconciled if it is assumed that she treated the uncle who was her guardian as if he were her father. In any event, her parents' names are listed in a 1923 record of her marriage to J. P. McEvoy as Ernst Wehrle and Eugenie A. Lerradde. These may be the names either of her birth parents or of the family members who brought her up.

McEvoy was described as petite. She was five feet tall, had blue eyes, and spoke English with a "soft-spoken French accent".

Date and place of birth

Public sources provide various dates for McEvoy's birth. Brief biographies on art reference web sites give 1879, yet as an adult she frequently said she was younger than she would have been had she been born that year. For example, on returning from France in 1906 she reported her age as 26, giving a presumptive birth year of 1880. Other presumptive birth years recorded in official records are 1888, 1889, 1890, 1891, 1895, and 1898. Some sources list her place of birth as New York and one gives "United States", while others give France as birthplace. An obituary says she was born in the United States and on the death of her parents was raised in France by her mother's family.

Those public records which give a day and month for McEvoy's birth all say she was born on March 12.

Other names

Her maiden name was Eugenie Wehrle. One source gives her name as Eugénie. She used Eugenie McEvoy as her professional name as artist and that is the name used in most newspaper reports regarding herself and her work. As a performer she used Mlle. or sometimes Mme. D'Aures. As a breeder of purebred collies, she gave her name as Mrs. G. Ames Aldrich.

Wife of George Ames Aldrich

At age 26 or 27 she married the artist George Ames Aldrich in Paris and in 1906 returned with him to New York.

Collie breeding

Aldrich and McEvoy moved about frequently during the early years of their marriage. Their travels took them to California, New England, and the Mid-Atlantic states of the U.S. as well as to Winnipeg, Canada, and, in 1910, back to Europe. One purpose of the trips was a business they had begun in 1910 to raise and sell purebred collies. Between 1914 and 1917 issues of the trade journal, Dog Fancier contained notes and display ads from McEvoy and Aldrich offering their dogs for sale. In 1917 they sold off their dogs and closed down their kennel. A biographic sketch published in 1975 says that McEvoy "once owned 47 collies, among them blue ribbon winners and champions several times over" and had become a recognized author on collie breeding (although no record of a publication by her survives).

Citizenship question

On July 19, 1919, Aldrich and McEvoy married again, this time in Chicago. No reason has been given for this second marriage. It may be that she thought U.S. officials would not recognize her first, French, one. In 1920, during a period when U.S. citizens were required to hold passports, Aldrich applied for one that listed both himself and McEvoy as his wife. It also may be that evidence of McEvoy's birth in the United States was weak. If so, that would explain why the passport application showed McEvoy as born in France to French parents and a public document of 1923 says she became a U.S. citizen by being naturalized through marriage.

Vaudeville sharpshooter

In 1919 McEvoy began to appear in a sharpshooting act on the vaudeville circuits of Illinois, Indiana, and Iowa. Billing herself as "Mlle. D'Aures" she called her act "The Curtain of Victory." Regarding one of her performances, a newspaper reporter said, "From the first line trenches on the western front to the vaudeville stage is a long step, but it is one taken by M'lle D'Aures and company, another feature of the Orpheum bill for Thursday, Friday and Saturday. M'lle and assistant present a most thrilling sharp shooting act entitled "The Curtain of Victory." M'lle D'Aures is a dainty little miss who received her training as a sharpshooter from her father, who was a captain in the French army. At one time, while shooting in a public gallery, she shot a match with King Leopold of Belgium, who appeared incognito, and she bested him." A news item appearing in 1975 reported that McEvoy had learned to shoot as a young child while living in France and at that age had been able to shoot a pipe from her cousin's mouth with a rifle. In 1921, on her separation from Aldrich, McEvoy stopped appearing on the vaudeville stage and concentrated on her career as professional artist.

Wife of Joseph P. McEvoy

On February 15, 1923, McEvoy married J.P. McEvoy, a successful author of comic strips, humorous stories, newspaper feature articles, and satiric plays. He was born in New York on January 10, 1895, and, like her, he had (1) been raised by a couple who were not his parents and (2) been previously married and divorced. He had assumed the name Joseph Patrick McEvoy in 1910 when entering his first year as a student at the University of Notre Dame. J.P. and his first wife had two children, Dorothy (born April 3, 1916) and Dennis (born July 27, 1918). By a previous marriage, J.P.'s first wife had a son, Reynold Thomas Wurnelle (later known as Renny McEvoy). When J.P. and his first wife divorced, Dorothy and Dennis remained with J.P. while Reynold stayed with his mother.

A few months after their wedding J. P. and Eugenie founded a New York theatrical production company called the Masque Producing Corporation and later the same year she drew designs for a one-act play he wrote called "Adam and Eve." Before the year was out they had bought a 20-acre estate in Woodstock, New York. Over the next few years they remodeled the manor house and added two wings to it, and later built a guest house, two studios, stable, and swimming pool on the property. In 1937 J. P. wrote a humorous article about it. Living there, Eugenie showed herself to be an accomplished horsewoman. J. P.'s success as a writer continued to grow and by 1928 he was producing his own plays with Eugenie as technical director.

In 1931 J. P. and Eugenie separated and he provided her with a substantial income. A year later Eugenie obtained a divorce in Reno, Nevada, and continued to receive monthly payments. In 1936 J. P. remarried. The same year he changed the settlement agreement with Eugenie, providing her with a monthly income and conveying to her the Woodside estate with its mortgage. The following year she sued him for failing make more than a year's worth of monthly payments for which the settlement had provided.

In 1939 and 1940 McEvoy had limited success in finding tenants for the Woodstock estate. In 1941 she converted it to a resort, called Fountainebleau, using musicians and other performers as service staff and in 1942 she sold off some of the land.

Wife of Philip O'Dell

On October 4, 1949, McEvoy married for a third time. Her new husband was a musician, Woodstock resident Philip O'Dell. The report of their wedding said they planned to open a school in Woodstock to teach piano and painting. Later, he taught her piano tuning and she helped him repair fine old pianos. In the 1950s, as a member of the Woodstock Garden Club, McEvoy created flower arrangements for the club's annual flower shows.

Close of life

During the two and a half decades of the 1950s, 1960s, and early 1970s, McEvoy remained married to O'Dell and continued to live in Woodstock. She had been 26 or 27 when she married George Ames Aldrich, 42 when she married J. P. McEvoy, and 70 when she married Daniel O'Dell. She had been 40 when she began performing on the vaudeville stage, 49 when she first showed her famous taxi painting, and 57 when she assumed ownership and management of the large estate in Woodside. She was 29 when she participated in her first, and 86 when she participated in her last exhibition in New York. On July 22, 1975, Eugenie McEvoy died in Woodstock at the age of 96.

Exhibitions

Between 1931 and 1957 McEvoy's paintings usually appeared twice a year during the summer season in Woodstock. Between 1934 and 1947 she showed in group exhibitions of the Woodstock Artists Association. In the early 1950s she showed at the Walk Up Gallery. This list of exhibitions is representative rather than comprehensive. It is taken from notices in local newspapers, particularly the Kingston Daily Freeman.

1922 Group exhibition, exhibition of work of alumni, Art Institute of Chicago
1927 Group exhibition, Woodstock Art Association
1928 Group exhibition, Society of Independent Artists, New York
1928 Group exhibition, Woodstock Art Association, Woodstock, New York
1931 Group exhibition, Society of Independent Artists, Grand Central Galleries, New York
1931 Group exhibition, Salons of America, American Anderson Galleries, New York
1933 Group exhibition, Salons of America, New York
1935 Group exhibition, County Association, Poughkeepsie, New York
1937 Group exhibition, Capital District Artists, Art Institute, Albany, New York
1937 Group exhibition, Twelfth Annual Exhibit of Artists of the Upper Hudson, Albany, New York
1940 Group exhibition, Blossom Festival Show, Woodstock, New York
1942 Group exhibition, Little Gallery, Woodstock, New York
1943 Group exhibition, Macy's Gallery of Tomorrow's Masterpieces, New York
1948 Solo Exhibition, Mollie Smith Gallery, Woodstock, New York
1948 Group exhibition, Deanie's Gallery Room, Woodstock, New York
1949 Solo exhibition, Town House, Woodstock, New York
1952 Group exhibition, Terry National Art Exhibit, Terry Art Institute, Miami, Florida
1955 Group exhibition, Recent Work Show, Woodstock, New York
1956 Group exhibition, Woodstock Museum of Art, Woodstock, New York
1956 Group exhibition, Guild of Craftsmen, Guild Galleries, Woodstock, New York
1961 Group exhibition, Woodstock Museum of Art, Woodstock, New York
1961 Group exhibition, Long Island University Galleries, Brooklyn, New York
1961 Group exhibition, Post Office, Woodstock, New York
1965 Group exhibition, Britts Kingston Plaza Shopping Center, Kingston, New York

Notes

References

Painters from New York (state)
20th-century American painters
20th-century American women artists
Modern artists
1867 births
1929 deaths
American women painters
School of the Art Institute of Chicago alumni